Sam Leach may refer to:
 Sam Leach (artist) (born 1973), Australian artist
 Sam Leach (Coronation Street), a character in the British soap opera Coronation Street
 Sam Leach (promoter), see Aldershot#The Beatles in Aldershot)
 Samuel Leech, sailor
 Sam Leitch (1927–1980) British journalist and television presenter